Stari Grad is a village in the municipality of Čaška, North Macedonia.

Demographics
According to the 2021 census, the village had a total of 83 inhabitants. Ethnic groups in the village include:

Macedonians 62
Albanians 15
 Others 6

References

Villages in Čaška Municipality
Albanian communities in North Macedonia